Quirino De Ascaniis (5 August 1908 – 11 January 2009) was an Italian-born priest who was the longest serving member of PIME. Until his death at the age of 100 in 2009, he was a missionary in China (Hong Kong). He was born in Giulianova.

References
PIME dean celebrates 75 years of priesthood, entirely dedicated to China
150 years of mission celebrated in PIME House Hong Kong
Quirino De Ascaniis' obituary

1908 births
2009 deaths
Italian centenarians
Men centenarians
People from Giulianova
20th-century Italian Roman Catholic priests